Haw Creek is a stream in Morgan County in the U.S. state of Missouri.

Haw Creek was so named on account of black haw timber near its course.

See also
List of rivers of Missouri

References

Rivers of Morgan County, Missouri
Rivers of Missouri